John Branner (August 4, 1886 – September 11, 1968) was an American architect. His work was part of the architecture event in the art competition at the 1932 Summer Olympics.

References

1886 births
1968 deaths
20th-century American architects
Olympic competitors in art competitions
People from Bloomington, Indiana